Peter Randy Mueller (born April 14, 1988) is an American professional ice hockey forward, currently playing for HC Vítkovice Ridera in the Czech Extraliga (ELH). He has previously played in the National Hockey League (NHL) with the Phoenix Coyotes, Colorado Avalanche and the Florida Panthers.

Playing career
Mueller was drafted 8th overall by the Phoenix Coyotes in the 2006 NHL Entry Draft. He plays as a center. He played in the USA Hockey developmental program for the 2004–05 season before moving to the Western Hockey League's Everett Silvertips. He followed former Breck High School teammate Blake Wheeler to the Coyotes, making the transition into the NHL during the 2007–08 season. Because of his outstanding performances in the first half of the 2007–08 season, Mueller was selected to play in the 2008 NHL YoungStars Game in Atlanta. He netted his first career NHL hat-trick against the Anaheim Ducks on November 7, 2007.

Mueller's 2008–09 season was a small disappointment as he couldn't replicate his 54 point performance of 2007–08, recording 36 points in 72 games.

In the 2009–10 season, Mueller's production further sagged, leading to a request to be traded.  Mueller scored 17 points in 54 games before on March 12, 2010, he was traded by the Coyotes, along with Kevin Porter, to the Colorado Avalanche for Wojtek Wolski. Later that day Mueller made his Avalanche debut, scoring a goal in a 4–3 victory over the Anaheim Ducks. In just 15 games with the Avs, after a 5–4 overtime victory against the San Jose Sharks in which he scored two goals and an assist, Mueller had already eclipsed his offensive production he managed to register with the Coyotes for the entire season before the trade.

On September 10, 2010, the Avalanche signed Mueller to a two year, $4 million deal. He suffered a concussion in an Avalanche regular season game against San Jose late in the 2010 season. He suffered it as a result of a hard check by former Avalanche defenseman, Rob Blake. He suffered another concussion in the last week of the 2010–11 preseason and was put on injured reserve.

Mueller made an anticipated return after a year of absence in the beginning of the 2011–12 season, but post-concussion syndromes forced him to the IR again. On November 25, 2011 it was reported that Mueller, who has been dealing with post-concussion symptoms, now had a groin injury as well. On January 12, 2012, he made another return in a 3–2 OT loss against the Nashville Predators. He scored his first points in almost 2 years on January 18, when he scored two goals and added an assist against the Florida Panthers in a 4–3 OT win.

At the conclusion of his two-year contract with the Avalanche, in which both were decimated by injury, Mueller failed to receive a qualifying offer prior to the opening of NHL free agency on July 1, 2012, making him an unrestricted free agent. On July 11, 2012 Mueller signed a one-year, $1.725 million contract with the Florida Panthers.

Despite a lockout shortened 2012–13 season, Mueller returned to full health for the first time since 2010, and featured in 43 games. After initially succeeding on a scoring line alongside eventual Calder Memorial Trophy winner, Jonathan Huberdeau and veteran Alexei Kovalev, Mueller slowed in his offensive output to finish with 8 goals and 17 points with the Panthers.

Unable to agree on a new contract with Florida, and with limited NHL interest, Mueller signed his first European contract on a one-year deal with Swiss club, Kloten Flyers of the National League A on September 6, 2013. In the 2013–14 season, Mueller played a full season to lead the club and finish third in NLA scoring with 46 points. At the conclusion of the season, Mueller accepted an invitation and played for the U.S. at the 2014 IIHF World Championships in Belarus.

In March 2014, Mueller stated in an interview that he is interested in returning to the NHL following his stay in Switzerland with the Flyers. On July 29, 2014, Mueller and the St. Louis Blues agreed to terms on a one-year, two-way contract.  On October 8, 2014, after failing to make the Blues roster, Mueller and the club announced the termination of his contract so he could explore his options to play in Europe. On October 10, 2014, Mueller expectedly returned to his previous club in signing a one-year contract with the Kloten Flyers. On March 20, 2015, the Kloten Flyers decided not to offer him a contract extension after tailing only 17 points in the 2014–15 NLA season.

On August 12, 2015, Mueller remained in Europe as a free agent, and signed a one-year deal with Swedish club, Malmö Redhawks of the Swedish Hockey League. In the 2015–16 season, Mueller quickly adapted to the Swedish League and contributed offensively with 13 goals and 25 points in 43 games with the Redhawks.

On September 7, 2016, Mueller as a free agent agreed to another attempt to re-ignite his NHL career in signing a professional try-out with the Boston Bruins, expected to attend their training camp at Warrior Ice Arena in Boston, Massachusetts. On October 2, 2016, Mueller was released from his try-out contract with Boston, however he accepted an offer with AHL affiliate, the Providence Bruins to begin the 2016–17 season on a professional try-out contract. He played the entirety of season with Providence, collecting 13 goals and 25 points in 56 games.

As a free agent the following off-season, Mueller returned to Europe in belatedly signing a one-year deal with Austrian outfit, EC Red Bull Salzburg of the EBEL, on September 20, 2017. Now, he is playing for HC Kometa Brno (Czech republic)

Career statistics

Regular season and playoffs

International

Awards and honors

References

External links

1988 births
Living people
American men's ice hockey centers
Arizona Coyotes draft picks
Colorado Avalanche players
Everett Silvertips players
Florida Panthers players
Ice hockey players from Minnesota
EHC Kloten players
HC Kometa Brno players
Malmö Redhawks players
National Hockey League first-round draft picks
Phoenix Coyotes players
Providence Bruins players
EC Red Bull Salzburg players
Sportspeople from Bloomington, Minnesota
USA Hockey National Team Development Program players
American expatriate ice hockey players in Switzerland
American expatriate ice hockey players in Austria
American expatriate ice hockey players in the Czech Republic
American expatriate ice hockey players in Sweden
HC Vítkovice players